Phyllidiella cooraburrama is a species of sea slug, a dorid nudibranch, a shell-less marine gastropod mollusk in the family Phyllidiidae.

Distribution 
This species was described from Bare Islet , Townsville, Australia. It has been reported from Pohnpei, Fiji and Bali.

Description
This nudibranch has a black dorsum with tall white-capped tubercles with pink or grey bases. These tubercles are in groups of 2-4 on the middle of the back, with smaller, single tubercles towards the edge of the mantle. The rhinophores are black.

Diet
This species feeds on a sponge.

References

Phyllidiidae
Gastropods described in 1993